José Luis Quiñones (born 1 March 1974) was a Puerto Rican boxer. He competed in the men's light middleweight event at the 1996 Summer Olympics.

References

1974 births
Living people
Puerto Rican male boxers
Olympic boxers of Puerto Rico
Boxers at the 1996 Summer Olympics
People from Aguadilla, Puerto Rico
Light-middleweight boxers
20th-century Puerto Rican people